Opaljenik is a village located in the municipality of Ivanjica, southwestern Serbia. According to the 2011 census, the village has a population of 219 inhabitants.

References

Populated places in Moravica District